Mount Gjertsen is a mountain,  high, standing  northeast of Mount Grier in the La Gorce Mountains, Queen Maud Mountains, Antarctica. It was discovered in December 1934 by the Byrd Antarctic Expedition geological party under Quin Blackburn, and so named in an attempt to reconcile Byrd's discoveries with the names applied by Roald Amundsen in 1911–12. Amundsen had named a mountain in the general vicinity for Lieutenant Hjalmar Fredrik Gjertsen of the Royal Norwegian Navy, who was second mate on Amundsen's ship Fram and later ice pilot for the Byrd Antarctic Expedition, 1933–35.

References

Mountains of Marie Byrd Land